Patrick Meagher Born 1973 in Manhattan, NY, USA, Patrick Meagher is an artist and art organizer based in New York City and the Catskills. He holds an MLA from Harvard University, a BFA from Carnegie Mellon, and has studied at MIT and the Kunstakademie Dusseldorf. He is a post-conceptual artist whose work explores how mankind is adapting spiritually and emotionally to the Digital Age. As an artist, Patrick works with painting, sculpture, installation, and video and is also a writer and editorialist for art publications. He is a co-founder of the Silvershed artist collective in Chelsea and of the Collective Show, an arts advocacy group. Silvershed has been featured in Harpers Bazaar as well as on the cover of Art Review, a new space of creative thinking and collaboration in the New York Art scene.

Patrick studied Fine Arts at Carnegie Mellon University and has an MFA in Landscape Architecture and Urbanism from Harvard University. He has also studied at the Kunstakademie Düsseldorf under Swiss artist Alfonso Huppi.

Exhibitions

His art has been exhibited at MoMA PS1, at Eyebeam Art and Technology Center (he was also a teaching fellow at Eyebeam), with e-flux, at the Hyde Park Art Center in Chicago, and at L&M Arts in Los Angeles. In 2002 his work "Flight Path" was exhibited at the Socrates Sculpture Park, which was reviewed by Holland Cotter in the New York Times.

References

Catalogues
 Moukhtar Kocache and Erin Shirreff, New York, 2004 Site Matters: The Lower Manhattan Cultural Council's World Trade Center Artist Residency 1997–2001,

External links
Official website of Patrick Meagher
Official website of the Collective Show
Official website of the Silvershed
[https://harvardartmuseums.org/collections/person/53865?person=53865

Artists from New York (state)
Year of birth missing (living people)
Living people
Harvard Graduate School of Design alumni
Carnegie Mellon University alumni